"Wait for a Minute" is a song by American rapper Tyga and Canadian singer Justin Bieber. The song was released as the intended first single from Tyga's 2015 album The Gold Album: 18th Dynasty, however was ultimately left off the final tracklist. The song is produced by Maejor.

Background 
"He's in this transition period," said Tyga of his collaborator. "I felt like when me and Chris Brown did 'Deuces,' it was like a moment. I feel like this would be a big moment for both of us with this song." The song is produced by Maejor Ali and was premiered on October 21. The song was then released for digital download on October 22, 2013  Then on October 29, 2013, it was serviced to rhythmic contemporary radio in the US.

Music video
The music video was shot on November 14, 2013 in Long Beach, California. " The video premiered on Access Hollywood on December 19, 2013, and was later released on Vevo and Tyga's YouTube channel. It was directed by Krista Liney.

Chart performance
Wait for a Minute debuted and peaked at number 68 on the US Billboard Hot 100 chart, selling 68,000 digital downloads in its first week, according to Nielsen SoundScan. On March 19, 2020, the single was certified gold by the Recording Industry Association of America (RIAA) for combined sales and album-equivalent units over 500,000 units in the United States.

The single also charted on French Singles Chart and in the United Kingdom due to strong digital download sales. It debuted on the French Singles Chart at number 103. In October 2013, it debuted at number 41 on the UK Singles Chart. The song also debuted at number 34 on the Belgian Ultratop singles chart. The song debuted at number 31 on the Netherlands Top 100 and at number 45 in Spain. It debuted at number 47 on the Canadian Hot 100 and number 6 in Denmark.

Track listing

Charts

Certifications

Release history

References

2013 singles
Tyga songs
Justin Bieber songs
Song recordings produced by Maejor
Songs written by Maejor
Songs written by Justin Bieber
2013 songs
Cash Money Records singles
Republic Records singles
Electro songs
Song recordings produced by Justin Bieber
Songs written by Jess Jackson (record producer)